The Great Northern Brewing Co., commonly known as Great Northern, brews a full and a mid strength Lager beer, owned by Carlton & United Breweries (CUB), it is brewed in Queensland at the CUB Yatala Brewery. It comes in 330mL "stubbies", 375mL "tinnies" and 700mL "Tallies" (ie. tall bottles) at 3.5% Abv or 4.2% Abv.

Overview
The Cairns Brewery Company opened the Cairns Brewery in 1924. In 1927 the Cairns Brewery Company ran out of money and a new company, Northern Australian Breweries was formed to take over and continue its affairs under the supervision of Captain Auguste de Bavay. It is a curious feature of the Queensland brewing industry that a great many more of its early brewers and beer entrepreneurs came from distant Victoria than from neighbouring New South Wales. The brewery produced a beer called Cairns Draught. The brewery was acquired by CUB in 1931 and was CUB's first brewery operating in Queensland. The Cairns brewery closed down in 1992. 

In 2010 CUB announced a new brand of beer, Great Northern Brewing Co. Great Northern is named after CUB’s first brewery in the state. It revives the classic marlin logo of the discontinued Cairns Draught.

In the bottles the full strength 'original' style beers are identifiable by the Gold coloured bottle top and a White coloured Marlin fish on its label whereas the mid strength has a Silver coloured bottle cap with a Black Marlin on the label.

It was recently (2022) the best selling beer in Australia.

See also

Australian pub
Beer in Australia
List of breweries in Australia

References

External links

Australian beer brands
Food and drink companies established in 2010
Cairns, Queensland
Australian companies established in 2010
AB InBev brands
Asahi Breweries